The Circus Tavern in Portland Street, Manchester, England, is the smallest public house in the city, with one of the smallest bars in the country. Built in about 1790, it is also one of the oldest pubs in Manchester, although it only became a pub in about 1840. The pub is owned by Tetley's, a Yorkshire brewery, and contains photographs of former Manchester United players who frequented the pub, including George Best. It was listed as a Grade II building in 1994.

References

Citations

Bibliography

Pubs in Manchester
National Inventory Pubs
Grade II listed pubs in Greater Manchester
Restaurants established in 1840
Commercial buildings completed in 1790
1840 establishments in the United Kingdom